Preeda Phengdisth (born 2 April 1931) is a Thai former sports shooter. He competed in the 50 metre rifle, three positions event at the 1972 Summer Olympics.

References

External links
 

1931 births
Possibly living people
Preeda Phengdisth
Preeda Phengdisth
Shooters at the 1966 Asian Games
Shooters at the 1970 Asian Games
Shooters at the 1972 Summer Olympics
Place of birth missing (living people)
Asian Games medalists in shooting
Preeda Phengdisth
Preeda Phengdisth
Preeda Phengdisth
Medalists at the 1966 Asian Games
Medalists at the 1970 Asian Games
Preeda Phengdisth